Fox Sports World Canada was a Canadian subscription television channel. The channel's programming primarily featured soccer and covered other world sports such as rugby.  Although its original Canadian Radio-television and Telecommunications Commission (CRTC) licence called for Fox Sports World Canada to carry soccer, cricket and rugby as their core sports, cricket and rugby matches almost disappeared from the channel after the first few years.  Fox Sports World Canada's flagship program was the Fox Soccer Report, which comprised most of its Canadian content.

On October 27, 2010, Shaw Communications gained control of Fox Sports World Canada as a result of its acquisition of Canwest; which subsequently was renamed Shaw Media.

On March 6, 2012, Shaw Media released a statement announcing that they would cease the broadcast of Fox Sports World Canada on midnight of April 30 of that year. The company had been examining the possibility of launching a mainstream sports channel in competition with TSN and Sportsnet, but ultimately decided against it. Shaw claimed the channel "no longer makes strategic and economic sense for Shaw Media going forward" in light of that decision. The channel officially shut down on April 30, 2012, while its license was officially revoked on April 19, 2016, nearly four years after the channel went off the air.

Programming
Fox Sports World Canada featured both live and taped events from the following leagues and competitions:

 Australia: A-League
 England: Premier League, FA Cup
 France: Ligue 1
 Italy: Serie A
 United States: United Soccer Leagues (USL) First Division (also from Canada and Puerto Rico), Major Indoor Soccer League, NCAA Men's Soccer, NCAA Women's Soccer & WPS
 CONMEBOL: Copa Libertadores

Noted programs
Asia Contender
Football Asia - Soccer highlights from around Asia
Football Rivalries
Fox Soccer Report - Flagship news show that featured highlights from all the major leagues in Europe, South America, MLS, International competitions and more.
Hyundai A-League Highlights - Highlights from the Hyundai A-League.
PGA Tour Highlights
Serie-A Highlights - Highlights from Italy's Serie A.
Sports Unlimited
Sky Sports News - A feed taken directly from the UK channel of the same name.

See also
 Soccer on Canadian television
 Fox Soccer

References

Canada
Sports television networks in Canada
Soccer on Canadian television
Defunct television networks in Canada
Television channels and stations established in 2001
Television channels and stations disestablished in 2012
Former Corus Entertainment networks
Digital cable television networks in Canada
2001 establishments in Canada
2012 disestablishments in Canada